Kenzie is a given name and surname which may refer to:

People

Mononym
Kenzie (rapper) (born 1986), British rapper
Kenzie (songwriter) (born 1976), South Korean songwriter

Given name
Kenzie Bok (born 1989), councillor in Boston, Massachusetts
Kenzie MacNeil (1952–2021), Canadian songwriter, performer, producer, director and politician
Kenzie Roark (born 1989), American softball player and coach
Kenzie Ruston Hemric (born 1991), American stock car racing driver
Charles Kenzie Steele (1914–1980), American preacher and civil rights activist
Kenzie Ziegler (born 2004), American dancer, singer, actress and model

Surname
Deon Kenzie (born 1996), Australian Paralympic athlete
Martin Kenzie (1956–2012), British second unit director and cinematographer
Phil Kenzie, British saxophone player

Fictional characters and places
Kenzie Bell, from Game Shakers
Kenzie Judd, from Coronation Street
Kenzie, Scottish town in Sputnik Caledonia

Places
Kenzie, Alberta, a locality in Big Lakes County

See also
Mackenzie (disambiguation)
Kensey (disambiguation)
Kinsey (disambiguation)